Manfred Eglin (10 October 1935 – 10 August 2001) was a German footballer who played as a goalkeeper. Born in Karlsruhe, Eglin played for Karlsruher FV and Stuttgarter Kickers, and represented Germany in the 1956 Summer Olympics.

References

External links
 

1935 births
2001 deaths
Footballers from Karlsruhe
German footballers
Association football goalkeepers
Karlsruher FV players
Stuttgarter Kickers players
Footballers at the 1956 Summer Olympics
Olympic footballers of the United Team of Germany
20th-century German people